Kenneth M. Weiss is the Evan Pugh Professor Emeritus of Anthropology and Genetics and Science at the Pennsylvania State University.  His research centers on the evolution of complex human traits, particularly  disease-related and complex morphological traits. He is a Fellow of the AAAS.

References

Further reading

External links 
 
 

American anthropologists
Living people
Pennsylvania State University faculty
Fellows of the American Association for the Advancement of Science
American geneticists
Year of birth missing (living people)